Edward R. Reilly (born November 28, 1949) is an American politician. He was a Republican member of the Maryland Senate, appointed by Governor Martin O'Malley to represent District 33 after State Senator Janet Greenip resigned. He then ran and was elected in November 2010 to his first full term.

Background
Reilly graduated from Essex Catholic High School in Newark, New Jersey. Reilly later received his Bachelor of Business Administration in banking and finance in 1972 from Iona College in New Rochelle, New York.

Reilly has been a member of the U.S. Jaycees since 1974 and was president of the Park-Adelphi Jaycees from 1976 to 1977 and is a past-president of College Park Jaycees. He is also a volunteer for the American Cancer Society, and a past-president of the Anne Arundel County Life Underwriters Association. Reilly is a Nationwide Insurance representative and owns his own insurance agency in Crofton, Maryland.

Reilly served on the Anne Arundel County Council representing District 7 from December 2002 to June 2009.

In the legislature
Reilly was selected by the Anne Arundel County Republican Central Committee to replace the retiring Janet Greenip who retired mid-term. He was sworn into the Maryland Senate on June 22, 2009. In 2021, he was elected to serve as the Deputy Minority Leader of the Maryland Senate.

In 2022, the Maryland General Assembly's Joint Committee on Legislative Ethics found that Reilly broke with the standards of the body after he told a constituent he planned to pull a bill they both worked on because she donated to his opponent's campaign.

Despite initially filing to run for re-election, Reilly announced he would not seek re-election to the Maryland Senate on April 18, 2022.

Political positions

Environment
In 2017, Reilly voted to uphold Governor Larry Hogan's veto of a bill to increase the use of renewable energy in Maryland, saying the bill would levy a "hidden tax" on consumers.

In 2021, Reilly was one of two Republican state Senators to vote in favor of the Climate Solutions Now Act of 2021, a bill that aimed to cut Maryland's greenhouse gas emissions by 60 percent by 2030.

Marijuana
Reilly identifies as an "advocate of medical marijuana". During the 2012 legislative session, he introduced legislation to ban synthetic marijuana. In 2015, Reilly was one of three Republican members of the Maryland General Assembly to vote for a bill to decriminalize marijuana possession.

Minimum wage
During a debate on legislation to raise Maryland's minimum wage to $10.10 an hour by 2018, Reilly introduced three amendments, including one that would have raised the minimum wage just once to $9 an hour in July 2015. All three amendments were rejected.

Policing
Reilly was the only Republican to vote in favor of the Police Reform and Accountability Act of 2021.

Redistricting
During the 2019 legislative session, Reilly introduced legislation that call for a ballot initiative that, if approved, would require the state's congressional districts to be drawn with respect to the boundaries, compactness, and commonality of populations. During the 2021 special legislative session, he introduced an amendment to the state's new congressional redistricting plan that would exchange the maps, drawn by the Legislative Redistricting Advisory Commission, with ones drawn by the Maryland Citizens Redistricting Commission. The amendment was rejected by a vote of 15-32. In 2022, Reilly introduced an amendment to the state's legislative redistricting plan to again swap out the LRAC-drawn maps with those proposed by the MCRC, which was rejected by a 14-32 vote. He later voted against the legislative maps.

Social issues
During a debate on legislation to legalize same-sex marriage in Maryland, Reilly introduced an amendment to change the bill's effective date from October to January 2013, which did not receive a vote. He later motioned to delay the bill to gain more time to prepare amendments. In 2015, Reilly voted against legislation that would allow transgender people to change the gender on their birth certificates.

In 2013, Reilly was one of two Republicans to vote in favor of a bill to repeal the death penalty in Maryland.

In 2014, Reilly voted against legislation to outlaw grain alcohol in Maryland, suggesting that the state should work on alcohol education instead of restricting sales of booze.

During the 2021 legislative session, Reilly introduced a resolution calling for "female monthly cycle tracking for adolescent girls" to be added to school health curriculum, which was met with criticism from reproductive health activists who called the proposal invasive and inappropriate. He later withdrew the resolution.

Electoral history

References and notes

1949 births
21st-century American politicians
Essex Catholic High School alumni
Iona University alumni
Living people
Republican Party Maryland state senators
Members of Anne Arundel County Council
New Jersey Republicans
People from Crofton, Maryland
Politicians from Newark, New Jersey